John Alexander Bryan (April 13, 1794 in Berkshire County, Massachusetts – May 24, 1864 in Menasha, Wisconsin) was an American diplomat and politician from New York and Ohio.

He removed to Ellicottville, New York, and was a member of the New York State Assembly (Cattaraugus Co.) in 1827.

Then he removed to Columbus, Ohio, and was Ohio State Auditor from 1833 to 1839. In 1840, Bryan settled at, and co-founded, what would become the city of Bryan, Ohio. He was U.S. Chargé d'Affaires to Peru in 1845.

Later he lived in Milwaukee and Menasha, Wisconsin. He served as editor of The Daily Milwaukee News. He was buried in Neenah, Wisconsin.

His son Charles Henry Bryan was a California State Senator, and his son-in-law John B. Weller was a U.S. Senator from California.

References

Sources
John A. Bryan at Political Graveyard

People from Berkshire County, Massachusetts
People from Ellicottville, New York
Politicians from Columbus, Ohio
Politicians from Milwaukee
People from Menasha, Wisconsin
Members of the New York State Assembly
Ambassadors of the United States to Peru
State Auditors of Ohio
1794 births
1864 deaths
19th-century American diplomats
19th-century American politicians
People from Bryan, Ohio